Earth is a 1947 Austrian-Swiss drama film directed by Leopold Hainisch and starring Eduard Köck, Ilse Exl and Anna Exl. Shot in the Tyrolean Alps, it combines elements of both the heimatfilm and mountain film genres.

Cast
 Eduard Köck as Der alte Grutz  
 Ilse Exl as Christine, seine Tochter  
 Anna Exl as Mena, Wirtschafterin 
 Hertha Agostini as Trine  
 Ernst Auer 
 Leonhard Auer 
 Ludwig Auer 
 Leopold Esterle as Hans

References

Bibliography 
 Hans-Michael Bock and Tim Bergfelder. The Concise Cinegraph: An Encyclopedia of German Cinema. Berghahn Books.

External links 
 

1947 films
Swiss drama films
1947 drama films
1940s German-language films
Films directed by Leopold Hainisch
Films shot in Austria
Austrian black-and-white films
Swiss black-and-white films